Enn is an Estonian masculine given name and may refer to:
Enn Eesmaa (born 1946). Estonian journalist and politician 
Enn Kasak (born 1954), Estonian philosopher and astrophysicist
Enn Kippel (1901–1942), Estonian writer and journalist
Enn Klooren (1940–2011), Estonian actor
Enn Kokk (born 1937), Estonian-born Swedish journalist and writer
Enn Kraam (1943–2001), Estonian actor
Enn Lilienthal (born 1962), Estonian sprinter
Enn Meri (born 1942), Estonian politician
Enn Kunila (born 1950), Estonian entrepreneur and art collector
Enn Mikker (aka Vormsi Enn) (born 1943), Estonian esoteric practitioner
Enn Nõu (born 1933), Estonian writer
Enn Nurmiste (1894–1968), Estonian politician
Enn Rajasaar (born 1961), Estonian architect
Enn Reitel (born 1950), Estonian-Scottish actor and impressionist 
Enn Roos (1908–1990), Estonian  sculptor
Enn Säde (born 1938), Estonian film sound designer and film director
Enn Sellik (born 1954), Estonian long-distance runner and Olympic competitor 
Enn Soosaar (1937–2010), Estonian translator, critic, columnist and publicist
Enn Tarto (1938–2021), Estonian politician
Enn Toona (1909–1973), actor and theatre director
Enn Tupp (born 1941), Estonian politician, diplomat, biathlete and Estonian Defense Forces major
Enn Vetemaa (born 1936), Estonian writer
Enn Võrk (1905–1962), Estonian composer, conductor and organist

References

Estonian masculine given names